Donald Ryan McCabe, Jr. is an American attorney and politician. He is a member of the South Carolina House of Representatives from the 96th District, serving since 2020. He is a member of the Republican party.

McCabe is a member of the South Carolina Freedom Caucus.   He also serves on the House Agriculture, Natural Resources & Environmental Affairs and the Regulations and Administrative Procedures Committees.

In 2023, McCabe was one of 21 Republican co-sponsors of the South Carolina Prenatal Equal Protection Act of 2023, which would make women who had abortions eligible for the death penalty.

References

Living people
Republican Party members of the South Carolina House of Representatives
21st-century American politicians
People from Columbia, South Carolina
1973 births
Newberry College alumni
Campbell University alumni